Iowa Township is a township in Jackson County, Iowa, USA.

History
Iowa Township was established in 1855.

References

Townships in Jackson County, Iowa
Townships in Iowa
1855 establishments in Iowa
Populated places established in 1855